Personalized Name Programs (or “Name Programs”) are usually gift or souvenir retail programs where the merchandise include names, and often titles or sayings on the product.

These programs are usually displayed as a line of the same product, often a rotating counter or floor display or a fixed wall unit.  The size of the display is determined by both the size of the products, and the number of names and titles offered.

Merchandise